Kokpara railway station is an Indian railway station on Howrah–Nagpur–Mumbai line under Kharagpur railway division of South Eastern Railway zone. It is situated at Kokpara in East Singhbhum district in the state of Jharkhand.

References

Railway stations in East Singhbhum district
Kharagpur railway division